Monodactylus sebae, the African moony, is a species of moonyfish native to fresh, brackish and marine waters from the eastern Atlantic, ranging from the Canary Islands down to Angola. It inhabits mangrove swamps and estuaries and can occasionally be found in lagoons.  This species can reach a length of  TL though most do not exceed .  It can also be found in the aquarium trade.

In the aquarium

This species is quite widely kept in brackish and saltwater water aquaria; although it has only very rarely been bred in captivity, it is otherwise hardy and easy to care for.

References

 

Monodactylidae
Taxa named by Georges Cuvier
Fish described in 1829